Simple Truths is an album by the American musical trio the Holmes Brothers, released in 2004. The trio supported the album with a North American tour.

Production
Recorded in four days, the album was produced by Craig Street. Greg Leisz played steel guitar on several tracks; Patrick Warren played pump organ. The trio's cover of "Shine" was inspired by the Dolly Parton version. The Holmes Brothers choose their cover versions based on the lyrics of the songs. Four of the album's songs were written by the trio.

Critical reception

Entertainment Weekly wrote that the cover of "I'm So Lonesome I Could Cry" "sizzles in the grease of a fuzz-tone guitar." The Leader-Post concluded that the Holmes Brothers "find the hallowed middle ground between the glory of stately gospel like that of the Blind Boys of Alabama and the rough-and-tumble blues of artists like T-Model Ford." Mother Jones praised the "breathtaking, churchy version" of Townes Van Zandt's "If I Needed You".

The Orlando Sentinel stated that "the music kicks, the singing is a classic mix of gravel and honey, and the material is outstanding." Billboard deemed Simple Truths "another sublime release spotlighting the trio's gospelized harmonizing, punchy instrumental interplay and effervescent eclecticism." USA Today wrote that, "with their born-again harmonies and lissome guitars, veteran blues trio the Holmes Brothers make even Bruce Channel's 'Hey Baby' and Collective Soul's 'Shine' sound as if they were fashioned out of rich Delta loam."

AllMusic opined that "Wendell's 'We Meet, We Part, We Remember' is the greatest pure soul tune recorded thus far in the 21st century."

Track listing

Personnel
 Sherman Holmes - vocals, bass
 Popsy Dixon - vocals, drums
 Wendell Holmes - vocals, acoustic guitar,  electric guitar, piano
 Chris Bruce - acoustic guitar, electric guitar
 David Piltch - upright bass
 Patrick Warren - organ
 Greg Leisz - lap steel guitar, acoustic guitar

References

2004 albums
Alligator Records albums
Albums produced by Craig Street